Ben McGarvey (born 22 December 1981), known under the stage name Minute Taker, is an English recording artist.  He has released three albums; Too Busy Framing (2008), Last Things (2013) and Wolf Hours (2022) along with several EPs, including Reconstruction (2017), and a series of albums available exclusively through a subscription plan called Secret Songs.

Early life and musical influences
McGarvey grew up in the Shropshire countryside. His interest in music began at the age of 12 when he started playing an old piano in the basement of his family home.  After having some music lessons he decided that he preferred playing by ear and began writing his own songs.  He has described how songwriting helped him to come to terms with his sexuality as a young teenager.

He told DNA Magazine in 2021 how he always loved '80s music; "When I was a teenager in the '90s I was particularly uncool because the '80s were so unfashionable at that point.  When I was 16 and went to college I got into a lot of alternative singer-songwriters like Kate Bush, Tori Amos, Björk and PJ Harvey.  I pretty much taught myself how to play piano by sitting down and working out their songs".  After college he went on to study contemporary music at university.

Too Busy Framing (2008–2009)
Following university McGarvey moved to Manchester where he wrote and recorded songs in his bedroom.  In February 2008 he self-financed his debut album Too Busy Framing (released under his own name).  Clash described the album as "carefully constructed, layered compositions with as much in common with Múm as David Gray and his ilk".  Manchester Evening News described McGarvey's songs as being "full of strange, hypnotic loops and samples, and the lonesome, existential imagery of his lyrics brings to mind a young Morrissey".

McGarvey has described how he sampled gay porn movies for one of the album's songs Lust, "creating the song's rhythm section from sounds created during intercourse".

Another of the album's songs Disjointed references serial killers Fred and Rose West.

In 2013, The 405 retrospectively praised Too Busy Framing stating that "As far as debut albums go, it remains an underrated hidden gem and continues to age rather well."

The Spiels (2010–2013)
In 2010 McGarvey formed a band called The Spiels (an abbreviation of "glockenspiels") with singer-songwriter Ryan Lamey.  The pair originally met when Lamey recruited some of McGarvey's backing band members for his own solo project. They later came to work together when Lamey replied to an advert McGarvey placed on Gumtree looking for musical collaborators and the project evolved into a 5 piece band).  Manchester Evening News described their music as "alternative folk-pop of infinitely dark hue" comparing their work to that of Arcade Fire, Kate Bush and Antony and the Johnsons.

The Spiels released their debut EP Nightvision Part 1 in January 2013.

Last Things (2012–2014)
In 2012 McGarvey adopted the psydonymn of Minute Taker and released a 4 track EP Postlude. In reference to his change of artist name McGarvey revealed in an interview with The 405 that "I never really felt comfortable using my own name".  He described how he'd spent time working in offices as a Minute Taker and was drawn to the name because it simultaneously sounded "mundane and fantastical".

On 15 April 2013 McGarvey released his second solo album Last Things.  McGarvey provided interviews for several publications including 'Notion, Attitude, Gay Times and The 405.  The latter featured two new videos of McGarvey performing Somewhere Under Water (from Last Things) and a cover version of Pet Shop Boys' Heart using piano, voice and various electronic instruments including a synthesizer and a loop pedal.

Last Things received favourable reviews.  As part of a feature on Minute Taker, Notion described Last Things as "A beautiful collection of electronic-orientated pop songs that sound like old recordings that have been rediscovered and restored by a renegade computer; glitching and looping."

Three promotional singles from the album were released; Merge, Let It Go & Alkali.  In February 2014 the 405 premiered Minute Taker's first music video for Alkali which incorporates clips from the 1922 expressionist film, Nosferatu, interwoven with degraded self-portrait footage and silent film-era narrational captions.  Skeleton Dance (the b-side to Alkali) has been played by Tom Robinson on BBC Radio 6 Music. Robinson also played Merge as part of a Kate Bush special show, citing McGarvey as a new artist who has been influenced by Bush's music.

HOAX My Lonely Heart (2014 - 2017)
McGarvey composed the music for a stage musical Hoax: My Lonely Heart which was shown at Manchester's Royal Exchange Theatre in June 2014.  Written by award-winning author Ravi Thornton, HOAX is a cross-media project consisting of the stage musical HOAX My Lonely Heart and accompanying graphic novel HOAX Psychosis Blues.  The musical, which was directed by Benji Reid, was described on the Royal Exchange Theatre's website as "a dark musical fuelled by those most destructive of tendencies: love and self-sabotage". The story is based on the experiences of Ravi Thornton's younger brother Roabbi (aka Rob) who committed suicide in 2008 at the age of 31, after having suffered a long battle with Schizophrenia.  McGarvey created the music live on stage using a loop pedal, piano and vocal harmonies to accompany the actors who sang the lead parts.

Minute Taker toured the North of England with the show in Spring 2017 culminating at The Lowry, Salford.

In 2018, the HOAX project was nominated for a National Lottery Good Causes Award.

To Love Somebody Melancholy (2015 - 2017)
McGarvey premiered audio-visual show To Love Somebody Melancholy at Chorlton Arts Festival in May 2015.  A collaboration with illustrator/animator Ana Stefaniak, the show was described by the Chorlton Arts Festival website as "a story told through a contemporary song cycle and projected photographic animations, exploring the melancholic temperament of artists".  Minute Taker toured To Love Somebody Melancholy across the UK in 2017.

Reconstruction & Secret Songs (2017-20)
Minute Taker released a new mini-album Reconstruction on 20 November 2017.  The 405 premiered the opening track In Slow Motion on 14 November.  The release features a cover version of the Pet Shop Boys song Heart which Minute Taker had initially recorded as a performance video for The 405 in 2013.  He released 3 singles from the album; Nothing To Fear, Reservoir and The Weight Of It All.  In a review of the latter, God is in the TV said: "Imagine a meeting of Alison Moyet and Doves, you get echoes of Kate Bush in the percussion and piano, and washes of Mancunian melancholy everywhere – the warmth is almost tangible."  Minute Taker supported the mini-album release with a tour of British churches in February 2018.

In late 2017 Minute Taker announced Secret Songs, a subscription plan service which would include albums of unreleased material.  Secret Songs Volume 1: Songs for Lost Lovers was released on 11 January 2018, followed by Volume 2: Almost on 25 May 2018,  Volume 3: Covers on 3 December 2018, Volume 4: Office Daydreams on 17 May 2019, Volume 5: Early Songs on 5 December 2019, Volume 6: Remixes on 19 August 2020, Volume 7: Piano Songs on 14 December 2020 and Volume 8: Soon After Dark on 7 October 2021.

On 30 June 2018 Minute Taker performed a new work in progress concept album at Hebden Bridge Arts Festival called Wilderness "exploring a desire to escape the structures of society".

Minute Taker remixed Yazoo's song Winter Kills for the band's Four Pieces: A Yazoo Compendium 4LP Vinyl Boxset which was released on Mute Records/Sony BMG on 26 October 2018.  The Quietus premiered the remix on 20 September 2018.

Minute Taker remixed Erasure's song Home for the band's reissued Chorus released on 14 February 2020 on BMG UK.

Wolf Hours (2019-22)
In April 2019, Minute Taker announced a new audiovisual show Wolf Hours exploring the psyches of several gay men at different points in time over the past century, supported by Arts Council England and Superbia at Manchester Pride.  The show premiered at Waterside Arts, Manchester in July 2019 at part of their REFRACT:19 festival of experimental arts.

On 9 October 2019 Minute Taker released a new single and music video from Wolf Hours called Hearts (We'll Never Know), inspired by 70s/80s horror movies.

Portsmouth FC showed the video for Not Afraid, the second single from Wolf Hours at a football match on 7 December 2019 to promote LGBTQ inclusion in football in support of Stonewall's Rainbow Laces campaign.  The video was directed by John Lochland (JL2 Productions) and explores the experiences and daydreams of a young gay footballer.  Minute Taker publicly released the video on New Year's Day 2020.

The Darkest Summer, the third single from the album was released on 12 August 2020 with a music video directed by Joe Stringer, set on a beach in the 1980s.  A fourth single 500 Breakups was released on 28 May 2021.  A fifth single After The Rain featuring fellow LGBTQ+ singer-songwriter Bright Light Bright Light was released on 6 August 2021 and received airplay on BBC Radio 2. The album's opening song, Lead You Home, was released as the sixth single on 14 January 2022. It was accompanied by a music video, directed by John Lochland, which depicted a relationship between two World War 1 soldiers.

Wolf Hours, the album, was released on 28 January 2022, following a successful crowdfunding campaign where fans pre-ordered "Wolf Pack" bundles, which included CDs, vinyl, cassettes and merchandise. The album ranked amongst the best albums of 2022 for several publications including Albumism and DNA Magazine. 

On 13 March 2022 Minute Taker released a charity single I Don't Understand (Song for Ukraine) to raise money for the Disasters Emergency Committee Ukraine Humanitarian Appeal.

On 6 September 2022 Minute Taker released an alternate version of the Wolf Hours album called Secret Songs Volume 9: Mirror Edition. Available exclusively as part of the Secret Songs subscription plan, the album featured alternate mixes and previously unreleased songs, including two collaborations with US synth-pop artist Color Theory.

Discography

Albums 
 Too Busy Framing (February 2008) as Ben McGarvey
 Last Things (15 April 2013)
 Secret Songs Volume 1: Songs For Lost Lovers (11 January 2018) subscription plan only release
 Secret Songs Volume 2: Almost (25 May 2018) subscription plan only release
 Secret Songs Volume 3: Covers (3 December 2018) subscription plan only release
 Secret Songs Volume 4: Office Daydreams (17 May 2019) subscription plan only release
 Secret Songs Volume 5: Early Songs (5 December 2019) subscription plan only release
 Secret Songs Volume 6: Remixes (19 August 2020) subscription plan only release
 Secret Songs Volume 7: Piano Songs (14 December 2020) subscription plan only release
 Secret Songs Volume 8: Soon After Dark (7 October 2021) subscription plan only release
 Wolf Hours (28 January 2022)
 Secret Songs Volume 9: Mirror Edition (6 September 2022) subscription plan only release

EPs 
 Postlude (5 November 2012)
 Nightvision Part 1 (January 2013) with The Spiels
 Alkali (3 March 2014)
 Reconstruction (20 November 2017)
 Running Up That Hill (Matt Pop & StarLab Remixes) (30 April 2021)

Singles 
 My Electric Wire / Disjointed (promotional single – June 2008) as Ben McGarvey
 Merge (promotional single – March 2013)
 Let It Go (promotional single – April 2013)
 Alkali (March 2014)
 A Captain / This Dark Man (promotional single - May 2014) from the stage musical HOAX My Lonely Heart
 Nothing To Fear (promotional single - April 2017) from the stage musical HOAX My Lonely Heart
 The Weight Of It All (8 January 2018)
 Reservoir (20 February 2018)
 Running Up That Hill (Kate Bush cover) (19 April 2019)
 Hearts (We'll Never Know) (9 October 2019)
 Not Afraid (1 January 2020)
 Under The Ivy (Kate Bush cover) (22 April 2020)
 The Darkest Summer (12 August 2020)
 Neon Lines with Walter Alienson (21 January 2021)
 500 Breakups (28 May 2021)
 After The Rain (featuring Bright Light Bright Light) (6 August 2021)
 Lead You Home (14 January 2022)
 I Don't Understand (Song for Ukraine) (13 March 2022)
 I've Seen You In A Dream (with Color Theory) (6 May 2022)
 Former Selves (26 August 2022)
 Just an Echo (with Color Theory) (16 September 2022)
 Northern Lad (Tori Amos cover) (with Jody Gadsden and Ryan Lamey) (21 October 2022)

Music videos 
 Alkali (March 2014) Directed by Ben McGarvey
 Nothing To Fear (April 2017) Directed by John Grey
 Hearts (We'll Never Know) (9 October 2019) Directed by Ben McGarvey/Raphaël Neal
 Not Afraid (1 January 2020) Directed by John Lochland
 The Darkest Summer (12 August 2020) Directed by Joe Stringer
 Neon Lines with Walter Alienson (21 January 2021) Directed by Skin&Bones & Bryan Rothschild
 Lead You Home (1 December 2021) Directed by John Lochland

Remixes for other artists 
 Winter Kills by Yazoo (Mute/BMG, 26 October 2018)
 Home by Erasure (Mute/BMG, 14 February 2020)

Shows
 HOAX My Lonely Heart (stage musical, 2014 at Manchester Royal Exchange Theatre, 2017 at The Lowry, Salford & other tour dates) Composer & performer
 To Love Somebody Melancholy (audiovisual show, 2015 at Chorlton Arts Festival, 2017 UK tour) Composer, performer & producer
 Wilderness (conceptual concert, 2018 at Hebden Bridge Arts Festival) Composer, performer & producer
 Wolf Hours (audiovisual show, 2019 at Waterside Arts, Manchester followed by various dates) Composer, performer & producer

References

External links
 

English gay musicians
Living people
Gay singers
Musicians from Manchester
English pop pianists
English pop singers
English male singer-songwriters
Folktronica musicians
Synth-pop singers
British male pianists
21st-century English male singers
21st-century pianists
20th-century English LGBT people
21st-century English LGBT people
1981 births
English LGBT singers